Mihriban Polat is a Turkish curler from Erzurum, Turkey. She currently plays second on the Turkish National Women's Curling Team skipped by Dilşat Yıldız.

Career
Polat joined the Turkish national junior women's team in 2016 as the teams' lead. At the 2016 World Junior Curling Championships, her team, led by skip Dilşat Yıldız, won three matches against Hungary, Japan and Russia, placing them eighth in the event. She then moved up to third on the team in 2017. The team had two runner-up finishes at the World Junior-B Curling Championships in both 2017 and 2018, however, Polat did not attend the 2017 World Junior Curling Championships. She would play second on the Turkish team at the 2018 World Junior Curling Championships, where they finished in last place with a 1–8 record. With Yıldız aged out of juniors, Polat took over the junior rink for the 2018–19 season. She skipped the junior team for two seasons, unable to qualify them for the World Junior Curling Championships in both attempts at the World Junior-B Curling Championships.

Polat joined the Turkish national women's team in 2019 as their lead. She played with the team at the 2019 European Curling Championships, where they topped the round robin in the B Division with a 7–2 record. This earned them the top seed in the playoff round, where they easily defeated England 9–4 in the semifinal. This advanced the Turkish side to the final, which they would drop 5–2 to Italy's Veronica Zappone. Despite the loss, their top two finish not only earned them a berth in the A Division for 2021, but also a spot at the 2020 World Qualification Event for a chance to qualify for the 2020 World Women's Curling Championship. At the event, Yıldız led Turkey to a 4–3 round robin record, enough to earn the third playoff spot. They then faced Italy for the final berth in the World Championship. Again, however, the Italians got the best of Team Turkey, defeating them 8–4 and earning the last spot at the Women's Worlds. The Turkish team did not compete in any international events during the 2020–21 season due to the cancellation of all events because of the COVID-19 pandemic. Berfin Şengül and Ayşe Gözütok joined the Turkish team the following season, shifting Polat to alternate on the team.

The 2021–22 season was a breakout season for Turkish curling, as the nation found relative successful in the international events they attended. At the start of the season, Erzurum hosted the 2021 Pre-Olympic Qualification Event to qualify teams for the 2021 Olympic Qualification Event. In the women's event, the Turkish team succeeded in qualifying for the Olympic Qualification Event, going 5–1 through the round robin and knockout round. Their next event was the 2021 European Curling Championships, where Turkey competed in the A Division. Through the event, Turkey posted three victories against Denmark, Estonia and Italy, enough to finish in seventh place in the group. This seventh-place finish was enough to earn them a direct spot into the 2022 World Women's Curling Championship, the first time Turkey ever qualified for a men's or women's world championship. Next was the Olympic Qualification Event, held December 5 to 18 in Leeuwarden, Netherlands. Polat, with Yıldız, Öznur Polat, Berfin Şengül and Ayşe Gözütok, finished 3–5 through the round robin. Their three victories, however, came against the top three teams in the event. The team defeated the eventual Olympic gold and silver medalists Eve Muirhead and Satsuki Fujisawa, as well as the silver medalists from 2018 in Korea's Kim Eun-jung. Into the new year, Polat and the women's team represented Turkey at the World Championship. After losing multiple close games in extra ends, the Turkish team was able to record their first victory in World Women's Championship history against Czech Republic's Alžběta Baudyšová 7–5 in Draw 17 of the event. The team ultimately finished the event in eleventh place with a 2–10 record, recording their second victory against the Scottish team who had to withdraw before the event began.

Personal life
Polat is employed as an athlete.

Teams

References

External links

Turkish female curlers
Living people
Sportspeople from Erzurum
Year of birth missing (living people)
21st-century Turkish women